Douglas Watson may refer to:
 Douglas Chalmers Watson, Scottish physician and writer
 Doug Watson (cricketer)
 Doug Watson (bowls)

See also
 Douglass Watson, American actor